BlackBerry Mobile is a trading name that was used by TCL Communication between December 2016 and August 2020 to manufacture and sell BlackBerry branded devices in all world markets, excluding the regions where BB Merah Putih (Indonesia) and Optiemus Infracom (India, Bangladesh, Sri Lanka and Nepal) operated.

BlackBerry Limited, the creator of the BlackBerry brand, decided in 2016 to cease competing in the smartphone market directly, to focus on making security software. The last smartphone designed and manufactured by BlackBerry Limited was the BlackBerry Priv. TCL Communication (which had already manufactured the BlackBerry DTEK50 and DTEK60, the last BlackBerry devices to be sold directly by BlackBerry Limited) was charged with manufacturing, distributing, and designing BlackBerry-branded devices for the global market. The BlackBerry KEYone was the first device made under the BlackBerry Mobile brand, although it was partially designed by BlackBerry Limited.

In February 2020, it was announced that TCL Corporation would stop manufacturing the devices on August 31, 2020, coinciding with the end of their access to the BlackBerry license. The last developed phone was the Blackberry Key2LE. In August 2020, BlackBerry signed a new licensing agreement for smartphones with the US-based startup company, OnwardMobility. The company never released a device before shutting down in 2022. The licenses to manufacture and sell BlackBerry devices in South Asia and Indonesia have also lapsed.

Device software
Devices made under BlackBerry Mobile will continue to be shipped running Android, along with security software, provided by BlackBerry Limited. This suite of software includes DTEK, BlackBerry Messenger, and BlackBerry Hub. Also, the software has a "secure boot" at start-up, to ensure that the Android system has not been tampered with. Many of these features are comparable to those from BlackBerry 10, BlackBerry Ltd's former flagship operating system.

History
In the early 2000s, Research In Motion Limited, other known as RIM, became dominant in the mobile industry, under the BlackBerry brand. They had a global dominance in the smartphone industry.

In 2007, RIM had the highest growth of the BlackBerry brand. Afterward, they slowly lost dominance, as many consumers were moving towards devices like the iPhone from Apple and the Samsung Galaxy, due to their all-touchscreen form factor. Later on, the physical QWERTY keyboard on a smartphone became a significant feature of BlackBerry, which the brand was named after.

RIM renamed to BlackBerry Limited, and then set a new strategy, this one focusing on improving their brand. The BlackBerry Priv was launched in 2015, as their first device running Android. The device came with a full touchscreen, with a QWERTY keyboard underneath.

In 2016, BlackBerry Ltd outsourced production to TCL to manufacture the BlackBerry DTEK50 and DTEK60. Later on, in 2016, BlackBerry announced that they are moving away from in-house manufacturing and production, and moving to become a software security company. In December 2016, TCL was chosen to be the global licensee of the BlackBerry brand.

At CES 2017, TCL showed off the rumored BlackBerry 'Mercury', although not stating any specifications of the device. Ahead of Mobile World Congress in Barcelona, Spain, TCL officially announced the device, stating its official name is the BlackBerry KeyOne. This device was designed by BlackBerry Ltd. rather than TCL. The device is sold under "BlackBerry Mobile" brand.

Devices

BlackBerry KeyOne (2017)
BlackBerry Motion (2017)
BlackBerry Key2 (2018)
BlackBerry Key2 LE (2018)

See also
BlackBerry DTEK50
BlackBerry DTEK60

References

BlackBerry